Vincent James Parisi (born 7 February 1978) is an Italian baseball player who competed in the 2004 Summer Olympics.

After his baseball career Parisi became a drivers ed and health teacher in the Pinellas County School District, he also owns a cafe with his wife in Palm Harbor Florida named "Canes Cafe".

References

1978 births
Living people
Olympic baseball players of Italy
Baseball players at the 2004 Summer Olympics
Parma Baseball Club players
T & A San Marino players
Nettuno Baseball Club players